Pyott is a surname. Notable people with the surname include:

 David E. I. Pyott (born 1953), American businessman
 John Pyott (1863–1947), Scottish-born South African baker and industrialist
 Keith Pyott (1902–1968), British actor

See also
 Pott (surname)